Omar Camporese and Goran Ivanišević were the defending champions, but did not participate this year.

Patrick Galbraith and David Macpherson won the title, defeating Jeremy Bates and Laurie Warder 4–6, 6–3, 6–2 in the final.

Seeds

  Patrick Galbraith /  David Macpherson (champions)
  Javier Frana /  Leonardo Lavalle (first round)
  Pieter Aldrich /  Danie Visser (first round)
  Mike Briggs /  Trevor Kronemann (semifinals)

Draw

Draw

References
Draw

Manchester Open
1992 ATP Tour
1992 Manchester Open